Homeland Party may refer to:
Homeland Party (Iran), a defunct Iranian political party
Homeland Party (Turkey), a Turkish political party
Homeland Party (Turkey, 2021), a Turkish political party
Homeland Party (Egypt), an Islamist political party in Egypt
Homeland Party (Libya), an Islamist political party in Libya
Homeland Party (Armenia), a political party in Armenia